Pensioners' Party or Party of Pensioners is a  name commonly adopted by political organizations composed primarily of people who have a pension (generally elderly retirees) and who are interested in issues affecting their demographic group. However, while some political parties appeal predominantly or significantly to elderly voters in terms of their demographic appeal, they may not be formally designated as a 'pensioners party'. Several populist, social conservative and nationalist parties within Western Europe, as well as New Zealand First, possess such attributes. 

Political parties that are known by this title include:

50PLUS, a political party in The Netherlands
Democratic Party of Pensioners of Slovenia
Dor (political party), a political party in Israel
Pensioner Party of Australia
Pensioners Party (England)
Pensioners Party (Norway)
Pensioners' Party (Hungary)
Pensioners Party (Scotland)
Pensioners' Party (Italy)
Pensioners' Party of Bosnia and Herzegovina
Pensioners' Party of the Republika Srpska
Russian Pensioners' Party
Croatian Party of Pensioners
Party of Pensioners (Croatia), a political party in Croatia
Club of Pensioners, political party in Czechoslovakia
Party of Pensioners of Ukraine

See also
 List of pensioners' parties

Pensioners' parties